Temoaya Otomi, also known as Toluca Otomi or Otomi of San Andrés Cuexcontitlan, is a variety of the Otomi language spoken in Mexico by ca. 37,000 people in and around the municipality of Temoaya, and in three communities within the municipality of Toluca: San Andrés Cuexcontitlán, San Pablo Autopan and San Cristobal Huichochitlan. The two varieties are quite different. The speakers themselves call the language . Lastra (2001) classifies it as a southwestern dialect along with the dialects of Mexico state. Lastra also notes that the endangered Otomí dialect of San Felipe in eastern Michoacán is most similar to the Otomí spoken in San Andrés Cuexcontitlan.

Grammar

Pronominal system
The pronominal system of Toluca Otomi distinguish four persons: 1st inclusive and exclusive, second and third and three numbers singular, dual and plural.

Nouns
Otomi nouns are inflected for possession. The particular pattern of possessive inflection is widespread throughout the Mesoamerican Linguistic Area. A possessed noun is prefixed with a morpheme agreeing in person with the possessor. If the possessor is plural or dual the nouns is also marked with a suffix agreeing with the possessor's number. Below is given the inflectional paradigm for the word /ngų´/ "house".

Articles
Plurality of nouns is expressed with articles preceding the noun, rʌ "the (singular)" or yʌ "the (dual/plural)":

Verbs
On verbs all of the categories of person of subject, tense, aspect and mood are marked by the means of a single prefix on each verb. The categories distinguished are Present, Preterit, Perfect, Imperfect, Future, Pluperfect, two different Subjunctives, present and past Continuative and Imperative. On transitive verbs Person of object is inflected by a suffix. If either subject or object is dual or plural it is shown with a plural suffix following the object suffix.

The structure of the Otomi verb is as follows:

Person, Number, Tense, Aspect and Mood
The present tense prefixes are di- (1st person), gi- (2nd person), i- (3rd person).

The preterite uses the prefixes do-, go- and bi-, perfect uses to-, ko-, ʃi-, imperfect uses dimá, gimá, mi, future uses go-, gi- and da- and pluperfect tamą-, kimą-, kamą-. All tenses use the same suffixes for dual and plural numbers and clusivity as the present tense, from here on only the singular forms will be given. The difference between preterit and imperfect is similar to the distinction between the preterit in Spanish habló "he spoke (punctual)" and the imperfect hablaba "he spoke/He used to speak/he was speaking (non-punctual)".

In Toluca Otomi the semantic difference between the two subjunctive forms (A and B) are not easily defined according to Lastra sometimes Subjunctive B has a meaning that is more recent in time than Subjunctive A. Both have the meaning of something counterfactual. The past and present progressive are similar in meaning to English was and is X-ing respectively. The imperative is for issuing direct orders.

Verbs expressing movement towards the speaker such as ʔįhį "come" use a different set of prefixes for marking person/T/A/M. These prefixes can also be used with other verbs to express "to do something while coming this way". In Toluca Otomi mba- is the third person singular imperfect prefix for movement verbs.

To form predicates from nouns the subject prefixes are simply added to the noun root:

Transitivity and stative verbs
Transitive verbs are inflected for agreement with their objects by means of suffixes, while using the same agent prefixes as the intransitive verbs to agree with their arguments. However in all dialects a few intransitive verbs take the object suffix instead of the agent prefix, usually these intransitive verbs are stative, i.e. describing a state. This has led to the interpretation that in Otomi morphosyntactic alignment is split between active–stative and accusative systems.

In Toluca Otomi the object suffixes are -gí (1st person), -kʔí (2nd person) and -bi (3rd person), but the vowel /i/ may harmonize to /e/ when suffix to a root containing /e/. The first person suffix has is realized as -kí after sibilants and after certain verb roots, and -hkí when used with certain other verbs. The 2nd person object suffix may sometimes metathesise to -ʔkí.The third person suffix also has the allomorphs -hpí/-hpé, -pí, -bí, and sometimes 3rd person objects is marked with a zero morpheme.

Plural and dual number of object is marked by the same suffixes as the subject, in some cases leading to ambiguity about the respective numbers of subject and object. With object suffixes of the first or second person some times the verbal root changes, often dropping final vowels.

A class of words that describe properties or states have been described either as adjectives or as stative verbs. This wordclass consists of words with a meaning of attributing a property to an entity, e.g. "the man is tall", "the house is old". Within this class some roots use the normal subject/T/A/M prefixes, while others always use the object suffixes to encode the person of the patient/subject. The fact that they use the same suffixes that are used to encode the patient/objects of transitive verbs to encode the patient/subject of the predicate has been interpreted as a trait of Split intransitivity. This phenomenon occurs in all dialects, but which Stative verbs the object prefixes, and how many take, vary between dialects. In Toluca Otomi most stative verbs are conjugated using a set of suffixes similar to the object/patient suffixes and a third person subject prefix, while only a few use the present continuative subject prefixes. The following examples of the two kinds of stative verb conjugation in Toluca Otomi.

Other affixes
Temoaya Otomi also allow different kinds of adverbial meanings to be inflected on the verb.

From Toluca Otomi examples of adverbial affixes are:
bí- An evidential prefix used about progressive events being witnessed by the speaker (It only exists in third person singular):

ga- A prefix expressing two simultaneous events or one event immediately preceding another. Also has the second person ngo-:

ndɨ- A prefix expressing that something was done well or a lot:

Other affixes express inchoative aspect, instrumental function or purpose. There is also a suffix with the meaning of "mean while"

Notes

References

 

Otomi language